Sheree Jemmotte-Rodney is the Attorney General of Montserrat.

References

Year of birth missing (living people)
Living people
Attorneys general
Government of Montserrat
Place of birth missing (living people)